The Apostolic Prefecture of Xining 西寧 is a Latin Catholic pre-diocesan jurisdiction in central China.

It is exempt, i.e. depends directly on the Holy See and its missionary Roman Congregation for the Evangelization of Peoples.

No statistics available. It borders on the Apostolic Prefecture of Xinjiang 新疆, Roman Catholic Archdiocese of Lanzhou 蘭州, Roman Catholic Diocese of Chengdu 成都 and Roman Catholic Diocese of Kangding 康定.

It may be vacant by demise, if so without Apostolic administrator.

History 
Established on 4 February 1937 as Apostolic Prefecture of Xining 西寧 (中文) / Sining / Siningen(sis) (Latin adjective), on territory split off from the then Apostolic Vicariate of Lanchowfu 蘭州府.

Ordinaries 
(all Roman Rite) 

Apostolic Prefects of Xining 西寧 
 Father Hyeronimus Haberstroh, Divine Word Missionaries (S.V.D.) (born 1937.11.12 – death 1969.08.13)
 Matthias Gu Zheng (顧征) (11 September 1991–).

See also 
 List of Catholic dioceses in China

References

Sources and external links 
 GCatholic, with Google map - data for all sections

Roman Catholic dioceses in China
Apostolic prefectures